Novochikeyevo (Yañı Sikäy) is a rural locality (a village) in Michurinsky Selsoviet, Sharansky District, Bashkortostan, Russia. The population was 34 as of 2010. There is 1 street.

Geography 
Novochikeyevo is located 32 km northeast of Sharan (the district's administrative centre) by road. Papanovka is the nearest rural locality.

References 

Rural localities in Sharansky District